Maple Mountain is a mountain, located within Lady Evelyn-Smoothwater Provincial Park, Northeastern Ontario, Canada, estimated  above mean sea level. It has a higher vertical rise over the surrounding landscape,  higher than the Ishpatina Ridge, which is the highest point of land in Ontario rising over Scarecrow Lake. Maple Mountain rises over Tupper Lake and is considerably better known than Ishpatina Ridge. It ranks thirteenth, but when ranked by vertical rise it is the highest of the top 25 peaks in Ontario. The 100-ft fire tower is also still intact and attracts many hikers. A 3.2 kilometre long hiking trail leads to the abandoned fire tower.

Located in Timiskaming District of Northeastern Ontario, the mountain is not very accessible; roads and trails in the remote area are difficult to travel in poor weather. The most popular approach routes to Maple Mountain are by canoe and/or float plane.

The indigenous Temagami First Nation call the mountain Chee-bay-jing, meaning "the place where the spirits go" and consider it a sacred site. The English name of the mountain was given by Dr. Robert Bell of the Geological Survey of Canada in 1888. Bell was the first known non-aboriginal to scale the mountain.

See also
 Ishpatina Ridge
 Temagami Magnetic Anomaly
 List of highest points of Canadian provinces and territories

External links
 Maple Mountain Myth - The highest point in Ontario
 Maple Mountain firetower
 Ontario's Highest Elevations
 Friends of Temagami

Anishinaabe culture
Mountains of Ontario
Religious places of the indigenous peoples of North America
Sacred mountains
Mountains of Canada under 1000 metres